Tapiraí refers to the following places in the Brazil:

 Tapiraí, Minas Gerais
 Tapiraí, São Paulo